Redemption is the third studio album from American country music artist Josh Gracin. It was released on November 8, 2011.

After Gracin was dropped by his previous record label, Lyric Street Records, in early 2009, Gracin began working independently on his third studio album. During that time, he released a couple of songs to country radio, but they failed to chart. In January 2010, Gracin signed with Average Joe's Entertainment, and his first single under Average Joe's, "Cover Girl," was released in August 2010. It charted briefly on the Billboard Hot Country Songs chart, reaching a peak of number 57. "Long Way to Go" was released as a single to Adult Contemporary radio, and became Gracin's first single to be promoted to the format, and has since reached the Top 20.

Critical reception

Thom Jurek of AllMusic was mixed on the record overall, praising tracks like "Long Way to Go" and "Only When It Rains" as highlights and commending the various musicianship from Gracin's road band but felt the track listing needed a few songs cut for length. He concluded that "Ultimately, Gracin is betting a lot on Redemption; each self-penned song reaches for a certain niche in the contemporary country genre, trying to cover all the bases programmers desire [...] whether this kitchen-sink approach results in garnering new ones is indeed a gamble."

Track listing

Personnel
Shelagh Brown- duet vocals on "Only When It Rains"
Tom Bukovac- acoustic guitar, electric guitar
Jonathan Crane- acoustic guitar
Will Doughty- keyboards
Loren Ellis- acoustic guitar
Josh Gracin- acoustic guitar, lead vocals, background vocals
Mark Hill- bass guitar
Claire Indie- cello
Shane Kiester- keyboards
Tony Lucido- bass guitar
Devin Malone- electric guitar
Mike Meadows- acoustic guitar
Kevin Murphy- drums, percussion
Russ Pahl- doblajes, pedal steel guitar
Hubert Payne- drums
Ben Phillips- drums
Ethan Pilzer- bass guitar
Holli Poole- background vocals
Danny Rader- electric guitar
Rich Redmond- percussion
Tripper Ryder- bass guitar, background vocals
Adam Shoenfeld- electric guitar
Jeff Smith- background vocals
Keith Thomas- keyboards, programming
Seth Timbs- keyboards
Ilya Toshinsky- acoustic guitar
Travis Toy- banjo, pedal steel guitar
Jonathan Yudkin- banjo, string arrangements, strings

Chart performance
The album debuted at number 167 in the Top Current Albums chart with sales of 3,000.

Album

Singles

References

2011 albums
Josh Gracin albums
Average Joes Entertainment albums